Hugo Redón Almela (born 19 April 2003) is a Spanish footballer who plays as a midfielder for Atlético Levante UD.

Club career
Born in Castellón de la Plana, Valencian Community, Redón joined Levante UD's youth setup in 2018, from hometown side CD Castellón. He made his senior debut with the reserves on 16 April 2022, coming on as a second-half substitute in a 1–0 Segunda División RFEF home win over CD Marchamalo.

On 23 August 2022, Redón renewed his contract until 2026. He made his first team debut on 10 September, replacing Joni Montiel late into a 4–1 Segunda División home routing of Villarreal CF B.

References

External links

2003 births
Living people
Sportspeople from Castellón de la Plana
Spanish footballers
Footballers from the Valencian Community
Association football midfielders
Segunda División players
Segunda Federación players
Atlético Levante UD players
Levante UD footballers